Nikolya is a tiny crater on the Moon. It is near the site where Soviet lunar rover Lunokhod 1 landed in November 1970, in the Mare Imbrium region. Its diameter is 0.12 km. The name Nikolya does not refer to a specific person; it is a male name of Russian origin, a diminutive form of Nikolai.

References

External links 

Nikolya at The Moon Wiki
 
 

Impact craters on the Moon
Mare Imbrium